Alexander Devlin (born December 12, 1949) is a Canadian former basketball player. He played for Canada at the 1976 Summer Olympics. He was born in Edmonton, Alberta. As of 2010 he teaches physical education at Port Moody Secondary School in British Columbia.

References

1949 births
Living people
Basketball players at the 1976 Summer Olympics
Basketball people from Alberta
Canadian men's basketball players
1974 FIBA World Championship players
Olympic basketball players of Canada
Simon Fraser Clan men's basketball players
Sportspeople from Edmonton